The 2013 Shakey's V-League (SVL) season was the tenth season of the Shakey's V-League. There were two indoor conferences for this season.

1st Conference 

The Shakey's V-League 10th Season 1st Conference was the seventeenth conference of Shakey's V-League, a collegiate women's volleyball league in the Philippines founded in 2004. The opening ceremonies was held on April 7, 2013 at the Filoil Flying V Arena in San Juan.

Preliminary round 
 Pool A

 Pool B

Quarterfinals 
 Pool C

 Pool D

Final round 
 All series are best-of-3

 Final standings 

 Individual awards

Open Conference 
The Shakey's V-League 10th Season Open Conference was the eighteenth conference of the Shakey's V-League, commenced on August 18, 2013 at the Filoil Flying V Centre, San Juan with 8 teams competing in the conference.

Final round 
 All series are best-of-3

Match results 
 3rd place

|}

 Championship

|}

 Final standings 

 Individual awards

Broadcast partner 
 GMA News TV (local)
 GMA Pinoy TV (international)

References 

Shakey's V-League seasons
2013 in Philippine sport